Alexander "Sasha" Jenson  is an American film and television actor known for his role in the 1993 hit film Dazed and Confused.

Career 
Jenson is also known for his roles in Halloween 4: The Return of Michael Myers, Dazed and Confused, Ghoulies II, and Buffy the Vampire Slayer. Jenson starred in the television series Teen Angel as Jason and made guest appearances in episodes of NYPD Blue and Monsters.

Personal life 
Jenson is the son of Canadian-born actor and stuntman Roy Jenson and European actress Marina Petrova. He attended North Hollywood High School, where he was a classmate of Adam Carolla.

Filmography

Film

Television

Video games

References

External links
 

Living people
Year of birth missing (living people)
Place of birth missing (living people)
20th-century American male actors
21st-century American male actors
Male actors from Los Angeles
American people of Canadian descent
American male film actors
American male television actors
North Hollywood High School alumni